Capo Passero Lighthouse is an active lighthouse located on the Isola di Capo Passero, the extreme south-eastern tip of Sicily.

Description
The lighthouse is completely automated, powered by a solar unit and is operated by the Marina Militare with the identification code number 2922 E.F.

See also
 List of lighthouses in Italy
 Capo Passero

References

External links

 Servizio Fari Marina Militare

Lighthouses in Italy